KHJ-TV/FM Tower (now known as KCAL-TV/KRTH Tower) is a  high self-supporting radio/television tower on Mount Wilson above Los Angeles, California, near the Mount Wilson Observatory. The KHJ-TV/FM Tower was built in 1983. It is owned by CBS Corporation and used by KCAL-TV (digital channel 9, 25,000 watts), KRTH (101.1 MHz, 51,000 watts), and KPWR (105.9 MHz, 25,000 watts).

See also
List of masts

External links
 
 

RKO General
Paramount Global
Radio masts and towers in the United States
Towers in California
Towers completed in 1983
1983 establishments in California
Buildings and structures in Los Angeles